Memorario is the commercial name given to the regional railway system of Tuscany, operated by Trenitalia since 2004 and based on a clock-face scheduling.

It consists of three types of train: fast trains (veloci), half-fast trains (semiveloci) and metropolitan trains (metropolitani).

Network 
Memorario operates numerous regional lines and continues to expand.

Metropolitan trains (Treni metropolitani)

Semi-fast trains (Treni semiveloci)

Fast trains (Treni veloci)

References

External links 
 Memorario